Pir Masood Chishti - PMC (born 2 January 1961, is a Pakistani criminal lawyer.
His firm Pir Masood Chishti Law Chamber PMCLC is based in Lahore and has expanded its operations across the country.
After completion of studies, he started to practice law in 1985.

Biography
 Advocate High Court & Supreme Court of Pakistan
 Ex. Member Punjab Bar Council
 Ex. Federal Secretary for Law and Justice, Ministry of law
 Ex. President Lahore High Court Bar Association
 Member Pakistan Bar Council
Pir Masood Chisti was born in Peer Sadardeen, Pakpattan District to a middle-class family. 
Chishti started practicing law in 1985. In 1994, he was appointed as Assistant Advocate General Punjab. Later, he served as a legal advisor of Lahore Development Authority, House Building Finance Corporation. He also served as chief legal adviser of Capital Development Authority.

Work

Political activism in field of law

Chishti's interest in the politics began during his college years whilst studying law from Multan.

Member Punjab Bar Council (1999-2004)
In 1999, he contested an election of Punjab Bar Punjab bar council and was elected as Member, Punjab Bar Council from Lahore where he served from 1999 to 2004 and also served as Chairman, Executive Committee.

Federal Secretary Law and Justice (2010-2012)
PMC was appointed as Federal Secretary for Law and Justice, Ministry of law and Justice  where he served for about two years.

President lahore High Court bar (2015-2016)

In 2015, Chishti contested the election of Lahore High court bar association and was elected as President Lahore High Court Bar Association for a term of one year from Feb 2015 to Feb 2016.

Member Pakistan Bar Council (2021-2026)

In 2021, Chishti again contested the election and elected as Member Pakistan Bar Council for the term of five years from Jan 2021 to Jan 2026.

References

Advocates
Pakistani lawyers
Living people
1961 births